The red-headed macaw or Jamaican green-and-yellow macaw (Ara erythrocephala) may have been a species of parrot in the family Psittacidae that lived in Jamaica, but its existence is hypothetical.

Description
Rothschild based it on a description which a Mr. Hill had sent to Philip Henry Gosse:

The Ara erythrocephala could have been found in the mountains of Trelawney and St. Anne's parishes, Jamaica. It was described to have been found in the mountains, and presumably in forest as well.

Extinction
It is believed that the main reason for the macaw's extinction was overhunting.

The macaw is extinct, and it is conjectured to have been hunted to extinction in the early 19th century. It was a close relative of the Cuban and Dominican macaws. Its existence is considered dubious today.

References

Ara (genus)
Controversial parrot taxa
Birds described in 1847
Extinct animals of Jamaica
Taxa named by Philip Henry Gosse
Taxonomy articles created by Polbot
Hypothetical extinct species
Taxobox binomials not recognized by IUCN